Fred Mollin is an American and Canadian record producer, musician, film and TV composer, music director, music supervisor, and songwriter. He has produced records for Jimmy Webb, Johnny Mathis, Billy Ray Cyrus, Lamont Dozier and America, and has composed music for Beverly Hills, 90210, Friday the 13th (films and television), Forever Knight, Hard Copy, and many more.
Mollin rose to prominence early in his career by co-producing (with Matthew McCauley) Dan Hill's international hit record, "Sometimes When We Touch", in 1977.

As an artist, he has written and produced music for a series of children's albums, including Disney: Lullaby Album: Instrumental Favorites For Baby, peaking at #6 on January 26, 2001, on Billboards Kid Album music chart; and Disney's Princess Lullaby Album, which peaked at No. 23 on October 25, 2002 (Billboard). He created the musical group Fred Mollin and the Blue Sea Band, composing and producing albums such as Finding Nemo-Ocean Favorites, Lightning McQueen's Fast Tracks, and others, primarily released on Disney/Pixar albums.

Early life
Fred Mollin was born (February 10, 1953) in Amityville, New York to Edward and Pauline Mollin, and is the youngest of three siblings. He began playing the drums at age six, the guitar at age eleven, and formed his first band at age thirteen, performing at junior high and high school dances. After seeing the Beatles perform on The Ed Sullivan Show in 1964, he was inspired to become a musician, singer, and songwriter. He attended Calhoun High School in Merrick, New York.

In an interview with Spirit of Harmony, Mollin said, "When my parents would tell their friends that I was leaving high school at 16 to make a life as a musician, they would all say 'we're so sorry,' as if I was terminally ill. In that day and age, it would have sounded better if I had gone off to join the circus".

Career
At age 18, Mollin moved to Toronto, Canada in 1971. His brother Larry had moved there a year before and urged Fred to come and see the creative possibilities. Mollin never looked back and in 1972, they formed Canada's first improvisational comedy group, Homemade Theatre. The four-man troupe consisted of Fred (musician, composer, singer, and actor), Phil Savath, Barry Flatman, and his brother, Larry, who also performed for three years on their own CBC television series, Homemade Television. In 1975, Homemade Theatre was awarded a Canadian Gold Record for their novelty single, "Santa Jaws".

Record producer
Mollin co-produced (with Matthew McCauley) Sometimes When We Touch, by Dan Hill, which became an international hit record in 1977. From 1977 through 1985 Mollin produced such artists as Jimmy Webb, America, and Randy Edelman. He also co-wrote and co-produced Stan Meissner's hit single "One Chance", which was covered by Eddie Money on his platinum album Can’t Hold Back. Mollin started a new career in 1985 as a TV and film composer, which became a full-time occupation until 1996 when he started to make the transition back to record production with the acclaimed album Ten Easy Pieces by Jimmy Webb.

Mollin relocated to Nashville in 2001, where he went back to being a full-time record producer for various artists and projects. In 2019, he started a new label, Melody Place, in partnership with Leigh Shockey, while continuing his freelance career.

Duets producer
Mollin is known as a record producer with a long history of producing duets involving well-known and iconic artists. These include Willie Nelson, Billy Joel, Carly Simon, Vince Gill, Glen Campbell, Crosby and Nash, Art Garfunkel, Jackson Browne, Linda Ronstadt, Michael McDonald, Amy Holland, David Pack, Sheryl Crow, Natalie Cole, Gregory Porter, Gloria Estefan, and Chris Cornell, among others. The albums by Jimmy Webb, Ten Easy Pieces, Just Across the River, and Still Within the Sound Of My Voice, have the most number of guest artist duet appearances. Other notable album examples with numerous duets are Johnny Mathis' Sending You A Little Christmas, Kris Kristofferson's The Austin Sessions, Barry Mann's Soul And Inspiration, Lamont Dozier's Reimagination, and Rita Wilson's AM/FM.

Mollin's most well-known duet is the 2008 duet, Billboards #4 country single, "Ready, Set, Don't Go" featuring Billy Ray Cyrus and Miley Cyrus.

Film and television music composer
In 1987, Mollin's work on Paramount's 'Friday the 13th: The Series'  gave way to 16 uninterrupted years of composing for film and television. His most well-known TV series include Tri-Star's Forever Knight, Spelling's Beverly Hills, 90210, Paramount's Hard Copy, Columbia Pictures' The New Gidget and USA Network's TekWar. His feature film credits include Friday the 13th Part 7 - The New Blood and Friday the 13th Part VIII: Jason Takes Manhattan. His TV movies include NBC's Amy Fisher: My Story, VH1's Daydream Believers-The Monkees' Story, and CBC TV's Little Criminals. He composed and performed the soundtrack for the television series Friday the 13th, mainly using synthesizers and samplers. The music was released on a soundtrack album by GNP Crescendo as the album Friday the 13th: The Series.

Mollin won a Gemini award for Best Original Music Score for a Series, Beyond Reality, in 1991.

Children's music
Mollin co-created the children's musical group Rugrats with Ronney Abramson and Ron Garant. The group's 1983 debut album, Rugrat Rock, was co-produced by Mollin; it won the Best Children's Album category at the Juno Awards of 1984. In 1985 they recorded a second album, The Rugrats Rock On.

In the early 2000s, Mollin began arranging and producing a series of Disney Lullaby albums: Disney's Lullaby Album: Gentle Instrumental Favorites for Babies (2000), Disney's Lullaby Album (2002), Disney's Princess Lullaby Album (2002), Disney's Christmas Lullaby Album (2003), Disney's Lullaby & Goodnight (2004), and Disney's Lullaby Album, Vol.2 (all released on Walt Disney Records).

In 2004, Mollin created Fred Mollin and the Blue Sea Band, a loose aggregate of studio musicians and guest singers Chris Stapleton, Tom Hambridge, Tim Ruppert, Lari White, Kevin Montgomery, Gunnar Nelson, Johnny Neel, and Webb Wilder, among others, primarily heard on Disney/Pixar albums:

2008 - Mater's Car Tunes
2008 - Ratatoulie What's Cooking 
2006 - Disney's Beach Party
2005 - Lightnin' McQueen's Fast Tracks
2004 - Finding Nemo Ocean Favorites

Songwriter
As a songwriter, Mollin has written or co-written songs for Cher, Eddie Money, Burning Rome, Toronto, Shania Twain, Stan Meissner, and others.

Awards and nominations

|-
|  || Jesus Take the Wheel (Passing Stranger Music Publishing)  || ASCAP - Publisher of the Year || 
|-
|  || Jesus Take the Wheel (Passing Stranger Music Publishing)  || ASCAP - Publisher of the Year || 
|-
|  ||Sending You a Little Christmas - Johnny Mathis || SOCAN - Film TV Award || 
|-
|  || The Passion - Beyond Reality  || Gemini Award - Best Original Musical Score for Television|| 
|-
| || Rugrat Rock|| Juno Award - Best Children's Album|| 
|-
| || Only the Lucky - Lodi - Ronnie Hawkins|| Juno Award - Producer of the Year|| 
|-
| ||Frozen in the Night - Dan Hill|| Juno Award - Producer of the Year|| 
|-
| || Sometimes When We Touch - Dan Hill|| Juno Award - Producer of the Year (Single)|| 
|-
| || Longer Fuse - Dan Hill|| Juno Award - Producer of the Year (Single)|| 
|-
| || Sometimes When We Touch - Dan Hill|| Juno Award - Producer of the Year (Single)|| 
|-
| || Longer Fuse - Dan Hill|| Juno Award - Producer of the Year (Album)|| 
|-
| || Santa Jaws - Fred Mollin/Homemade Television|| Juno Award - Producer of the Year || 
|-

Discography
2020 - Rumer - Nashville Tears - producer
2020 - Rena Strober - Imagine That! - producer 
2020 - Michelle Creber - Storm - producer
2020 - Mandy Barnett - A Nashville Songbook - producer
2020 - Mandy Barnett - Help Me Make it Through the Night - producer, guitar, percussion
2020 - Lisa Mills - The Triangle - producer, guitar, percussion, photography
2019 - Bat McGrath - Bat McGrath - co-producer
2019 - Brook Moriber - Steal the Thunder - producer
2019 - Fred Mollin - Fast Company (soundtrack) - producer, vocals, guitar, score, composer
2019 - Fred Mollin - Sogni D'Oro (Italian version of Disney's Lullaby) - primary artist
2019 - The Ides of March - Play On - producer, Hammond B3, Harmonica, Harpsichord
2019 - Mandy Barnett - The End of the World - producer
2019 - Jared Weiss - Isolated Thunderstorms - producer
2018 - Matthew McCauley - Signals Through Noise (produced w Matthew McCauley and Andrew Hermant)
2018 - Danny Kortchmar - Honey Don't Leave L.A. co-producer
2018 - Michelle Creber - On Display - producer
2018 - Rob Galbraith - Where I've Been - executive producer, curator
2017 - Carter Beckworth - Stand Up - producer
2017 - Annie Bonsignore - Durban Girl - producer
2017 - Amanda McBroom - Voices - producer, guitar
2017 - Barry Mann and Cynthia Weil - Demos, Live Performances and Rarities - executive producer, curator 
2017 - Shai Littlejohn - Battleground - producer
2016 - Jo Harman - People We Become - producer
2016 - Jim Peterik - The Songs - producer, guitar, harmonica, percussion, vocals (background)
2016 - Amy Holland - Light On My Path - producer 
2915 - Peter Oyole - When the Wide World Roars - producer 
2015 - Matteo Setti - producer
2015 -	Lexi Walker - Merry Christmas - producer, Arranger, guitar (acoustic), percussion
2014 - Engelbert Humperdinck - A Certain Smile (Johnny Mathis Duet) - vocal producer
2014 - Fred Mollin - Martha's Vineyards Lullaby Album artist, composer, producer 
2013 - Tenille Townes - Light - producer, guitar (acoustic), guitar (electric), synthesizer, percussion, vocals (background), composer
2013 - Johnny Mathis - Sending You a Little Christmas - producer, guitar (acoustic), guitar (electric), Keyboards, percussion, vocals (background)
2013 -	Jimmy Webb - Still Within the Sound of My Voice - producer, guitar (electric), organ, synthesizer, percussion, vocals (background)
2013 - Carter Beckworth - Humble Pie - producer
2013 -	Jim Brickman - The Magic of Christmas - producer, "Sending You a Little Christmas"
2012 -	Rita Wilson - AM/FM - producer, guitar, guitar (12 string acoustic), guitar (acoustic), percussion
2013 - Dan Hill - Intimate - co-producer
2012 -	Pan Am: Music from and Inspired by the Original Series - producer, "Do You Want To Know a Secret?"
2012 -	Barbra Streisand - Try To Win a Friend - additional production
2012 -	Disney's Songs And Story: Finding Nemo - composer, producer
2012 -	Johnny Mathis - The Complete Christmas Collection 1958-2010 - producer of "What a Wonderful World"
2011 -	J.D. Souther - Natural History - producer
2011 -	America - Back Pages - producer, guitar (12 string acoustic), synthesizer, percussion, vocals (background)
2011 - Tenille Townes - Real - producer
2011 -	Ronnie Hawkins - The Ballads of Ronnie Hawkins - producer, various tracks
2011 -	Johnny Mathis - The Ultimate Collection - multiple producers
2011 - Manny Pacquiao (featuring Dan Hill) - Sometimes When We Touch - co-producer
2010 - Jimmy Webb - Just Across the River - producer, guitar (electric), Harmonica, synthesizer, percussion, vocals (background)
2010 - Frank Hernandez - Since You've Gone - producer
2010 -	Johnny Mathis - Let It Be Me: Mathis in Nashville - producer, guitar (acoustic), sitar (electric), percussion, arranger
2010 - Lewis Moorman - Extended Play - producer
2010 - Jason Herndon - producer
2010 - Shannon Micol - No More Cinderella - producer
2010 - Steve Johannnesen - All the Right Reasons - producer
2010 -	Playhouse Disney: Let's Dance - composer, producer, "Rollin"
2010 -	Paul Quarrington -Are You Ready? - producer 
2009 - 10th Concession - producer
2009 -	Mater's Car Tunes - producer, songwriter, guitar
2009 - Los Lobos - Rolling Handy Manny Soundtrack - songwriter
2008 -	Billy Ray Cyrus and Miley Cyrus - Ready Set Don’t Go - producer
2008 -	Billy Ray Cyrus and Miley Cyrus - Ready Set Don’t Go - producer
2008 -	Disney Adventures In Bluegrass - producer, autoharp
2008 -	Disney Doubles: Cars - composer, primary artist
2008 -	Disneymania, Vol. 6 - executive producer
2008 -	Disney's Handy Manny - composer, producer
2008 -	Horror Tracks: The Scariest Horror-Soundtracks - composer, primary artist
2008 - Danny Kortchmar and Immediate Family - Honey Don't Leave L.A. - co-producer with Danny Kortchmar and Steve Postell
2008 -	Lilo and Stitch Hawaiian, Vol. 2 Disney - producer
2008 -	ABC's Love Affair - executive producer
2008 -	Sleepytime Lullabies (Nickelodeon) - producer, arranger
2007 -	A Disney Channel Holiday - 	producer, executive producer
2007 -	Fred Mollin Christmas Lullaby - primary artist
2007 -	Disneymania 5 - executive producer
2007 -	Everlife - Everlife - producer, guitar, executive producer
2007 -	Disney Channel Family Holiday - producer, executive producer
2007 - Country Superstarz - various artists - producer
2007 -	Hallelujah Country - producer, arranger, guitar (acoustic), guitar (12 string acoustic), Banjo
2007 -	High School Musical: Hits Collection (box set) - executive producer
2007 -	High School Musical: The Concert - executive producer
2007 -	Billy Ray Cyrus - Home at Last - producer, guitar (12 string acoustic), synthesizer, vocals (background), organ (Hammond)
2007 -	The Cheetah Girls - In Concert: The Party's Just Begun Tour - audio production, executive producer
2007 -	Jump In! - executive producer
2007 -	Jimmy Webb - Live and At Large - producer
2007 -	Pixar Buddy Songs -	(Disney) - producer, composer, primary artist
2007 - T-Squad - T-Squad - executive producer
2007 -	Radio Disney Jams, Vol. 9 (Disney) - executive producer
2007 -	Ratatouille: What's Cooking? (Disney) - composer, primary artist, co-producer
2006 -	Cars: Lightning McQueen's Fast Tracks (Disney) - producer, primary artist, composer
2006 -	Fred Mollin - More Music from Forever Knight - primary artist, arranger, producer
2006 -	Tennessee River Authority - Ramblin' Roads: A Bluegrass Collection producer
2006 - Jennifer Clarke - Just About Gone - producer
2006 -	America - Silent Letter/Alibi - co-producer, guitar (acoustic), percussion, vocals (background)
2005 -	Disney's Beach Party (Disney's Karaoke Series) - co-producer, vocals
2005 -	Disney's Beach Party (Disney) - producer, vocals, guitar (acoustic), guitar (electric), primary artist
2005 -	Fred Mollin - Disney's Lullaby Album, Vol. 2 - primary artist, producer, arranger, performer, musician
2005 -	Fred Mollin - Friday the 13th, Pts. 7 & 8 (soundtrack) - composer, producer
2005 -	Collin Raye - Hurricane Jane - 	producer
2005 -	Collin Raye - I Know That's Right - producer
2005 -	Lilo & Stitch 2: Island Favorites (Disney) - producer
2005 - John Landry - Someday - producer
2005 -	Collin Raye - Twenty Years and Change - producer, guitar (acoustic)
2005 -	Jimmy Webb - Twilight of the Renegades - producer, various tracks
2004 -	Disney's Lullaby & Goodnight - producer, arranger, musician, primary artist
2004 -	Gordie Sampson - Sunburn - executive producer
2004 -	Kris Kristofferson - The Essential - producer on "Please Don't Tell Me How the Story Ends"
2004 - Rob Galbraith - Too Long at the Fair - producer
2004 - Louise Pitre - Shattered - producer
2003 -	Bluegrass: American Classics - producer, arranger, autoharp
2003 -	Nell Bryden - Day for Night - producer, guitar (acoustic), guitar (electric), composer
2003 -	Disney's Christmas Lullaby Album (Disney) -	producer, arranger, musician, composer, guitar, primary artist
2003 -	Finding Nemo: Ocean Favorites (Disney) - producer, arranger, conductor, guitar, theremin, primary artist
2003 -	O Mickey, Where Art Thou? (Disney) - producer, compilation producer, guitar (acoustic), autoharp
2003 -	Sounds of Wood and Steel, Vol. 3 - producer of "You Just Missed Me" - producer, composer, artist, musician
2003 -	Janey Street - Street Less Traveled - producer, guitar (acoustic)
2002 -	Lilo & Stitch: Island Favorites (Disney) - producer, various tracks
2002 -	Disney's Princess Lullaby Album - producer, musician, composer, primary artist
2001 -	America - Definitive America - co-producer, guitar, percussion, various tracks
2000 -	Fred Mollin - Disney's Lullaby Album: Gentle Instrumental Favorites for Babies - primary artist,	producer, arranger, performer, musician
2000 -	America - Highway: 30 Years of America - co-producer, guitar, percussion, various tracks
2000 -	Barry Mann - Soul & Inspiration - producer, guitar (acoustic), guitar (electric), celeste, sampled strings
1999 -	Frank Stallone - In Love in Vain - co-producer
1999 -	Dan Hill - Love of My Life: The Best of Dan Hill - co-producer, various tracks
1999	More Music from Forever Knight (original soundtrack) - producer, liner notes, performer, composer
1999 -	Amanda McBroom - Portraits: Best Of Amanda McBroom - compilation producer, producer of various tracks
1999 -	Superstar (original soundtrack) - co-producer of "Sometimes When We Touch"
1999 -	Kris Kristofferson - The Austin Sessions - producer, musician
1998 -	Barney - Barney's Great Adventure - co-producer, various tracks
1998 -	Sci-Fi's Greatest Hits, Vol. 1: Final Frontiers - composer, various tracks
1998 -	Sci-Fi's Greatest Hits, Vol. 2: Dark Side - composer, various tracks
1998 - Sci-Fi's Greatest Hits, Vol. 3: Uninvited - composer, various tracks
1997 -	Fantastic Television!! - composer, various tracks
1997 -	Michael McDonald & Amy Holland - Men Are from Mars, Women Are from Venus - producer of "All I Know"
1997 - Fred Mollin - Deepwater Black (soundtrack) - composer, performer, producer
1997 -	Vampire Themes - composer, various tracks
1996 -	Fred Mollin - Forever Knight (original TV soundtrack) - primary artist, producer, composer
1996 -	Jimmy Webb - Ten Easy Pieces - producer, guitar (acoustic), autoharp, vocals (background)
1995 -	Vineyard Sound, Vol. 2 - Last Boat Home - producer, composer, artist, musician
1994 - Super Scary Monster Party (various artists) - producer, composer, artist
1994 - The Essential Vampire Theme Collection - producer
1994 -	Dan Hill - Let Me Show You: Greatest Hits & More - co-producer, various tracks
1994 - One Life to Live: The Best of Love (original TV soundtrack) - producer
1993 - The Vineyard Sound, Vol. 1 - Katama Meditation Instrumental Track - composer, artist 
1990 - Frank Stallone - Day In Day Out - co-producer
1986 - Eddie Money - Can't Hold Back - songwriter, "One Chance"
1983 - Toronto - Girls Night Out - songwriter, "(Don't Give Me The) Once Over"
1982 - Jimmy Webb - Angel Heart - co-producer, guitar, vocals (background), percussion
1981 - America - Alibi - co-producer, guitar (acoustic), percussion, vocals (background)
1980 -	Michael Stanley Band - Heartland - Mixing
1980 -	Marc Tanner / Marc Tanner Band - Temptation - producer
1980 - Blaise Tosti - American Lovers - producer
1979 -	Bishop & Gwinn - This Is Our Night - co-producer, guitar, percussion
1979 -	Randy Edelman - You're the One - co-producer, percussion, vocals (background)
1978 - McCluskey - GRT - co-producer
1978 -	Dan Hill - Frozen in the Night - producer, guitar (acoustic), percussion, vocals (background)
1978 -	Bat McGrath - The Spy - co-producer, vocals, guitar, percussion, vocals (background)
1977 -	Bat McGrath - From the Blue Eagle - co-producer, vocals, guitar, percussion
1978 - Ronney Abramson - Jukebox of Paris - co-producer, 6 tracks
1977 -	Dan Hill - Longer Fuse - producer, vocals, guitar, percussion, vocals (background)
1977 - Ronney Abramson - Stowaway (True North) - co-producer
1976 -	Dan Hill - Hold On - producer, vocals, guitar, percussion, vocals (background)
1976 -	Paul Clinch & Choya - Living Like a Rich Man - guitar
1975 - CB Victoria - Dawning Day - co-producer 
1974 - Dan Hill - Dan Hill - producer, guitar, vocals
1972 -	Marc Jonson - Years - drums, vocals (background)
1971 - Ellen Warshaw - Ellen Warshaw - co-writer of 2 tracks, acoustic guitar

Filmography
2017 - The Lears (film) (music supervisor)
2011 - Manny Pacquiao (featuring Dan Hill): Sometimes When We Touch (video documentary short) (music producer)
2002 - Mad Dog Prosecutors (documentary) (composer)
2000-2001 - In a Heartbeat (TV series) (21 episodes) (composer)
2001 - Borderline Normal2000 - Daydream Believers: The Monkees' Story (TV movie) (original score) (music supervisor)
2000 - Pilgrim (film)
1999 - Thrill Seekers (TV movie)
1999 - The Fall (film) (composer)
1999 - Roswell: The Aliens Attack (TV movie) (composer)
1999 - Family of Cops III: Under Suspicion (TV movie)
1998 - Dream House (TV movie) (composer)
1998 - White Lies (TV movie) (music supervisor) (composer)
1997 - Freaky Stories (TV series) (1 episode) (composer)
1997 - Field Trip/The Story/Panty Raid/The Experiment (1997) (segment: "The Experiment") (composer)
1997 - Mission Genesis (TV series) (13 episodes) (composer)
1997 - Big Guns Talk: The Story of the Western (TV movie documentary) (composer)
1996-1997 - Beverly Hills, 90210 (TV series) (11 episodes) (composer)
1996 - The Abduction (TV movie) (composer) 
1992-1996 - Forever Knight (TV series) (70 episodes) (composer)
1994-1996 - TekWar (TV series) (18 episodes) (composer)
1995 - Little Criminals (TV movie) (music score) (music supervisor)
1995 - Haunted Lives: True Ghost Stories (TV miniseries documentary) (1 episode) (composer)
1995 - Blind Faith (composer: theme music)
1995 - Baby Baby (composer: theme music) (musician)
1995 - The Outer Limits (TV series) (2 episodes) (Composer)
1995 - Hangtime (TV series) (composer - 1 episode) 
1995 - Pilot (composer: theme music)
1994 - Gene Autry, Melody of the West (documentary) (composer)
1994 - The Odyssey (TV series) (13 episodes) (composer) 
1993 - Phenom (TV series) (1 episode) (composer)
1993 - Liar, Liar: Between Father and Daughter (TV movie) (composer)
1993 - In Advance of the Landing (documentary) (composer)
1993 - Survive the Night (TV movie) (composer)
1992 - Amy Fisher: My Story (TV movie) (composer)
1991-1992 - Beyond Reality (TV series) (44 episodes) (composer)
1991-1993 - Tropical Heat aka Sweating Bullets (TV series) (theme song, composer, 13 episodes)
1991 - Revenge of the Nerds (TV Short) (composer: theme music)
1990 - Whispers (composer)
1987-1990 - Friday the 13th: The Series (TV series) (72 episodes) (composer)
1989 - My Secret Identity (TV series) (44 episodes) (composer)
1989 - War of the Worlds (TV series) (composer - 6 episodes, 1989–1990) 
1989 - Friday the 13th Part VIII: Jason Takes Manhattan (composer)
1989 - Where the Spirit Lives (recording supervisor: Toronto) (composer)
1989 - CBS Summer Playhouse (TV series) (music performer - 1 episode) (composer)
1988-1989 - Ramona (TV series) (10 episodes) (composer)
1988 - Family Reunion (composer)
1988 - Friday the 13th Part VII: The New Blood (composer)
1987-1988 - The New Gidget (TV series) (40 episodes) (composer)
1988 - The Ray Bradbury Theater (TV series) (1 episode) (composer)
1987 - First Offender (TV movie) (composer)
1987 - It's Only Rock & Roll (TV series) (musical director) (co-host) (14 episodes) (composer)
1985-1987 - ABC Afterschool Special (TV series) (2 episodes) (composer)
1987 - Really Weird Tales (TV movie) (segment composer: "Cursed with Charisma") (composer: theme song written by Fred Mollin)
1987 - The Hanoi Hilton (music producer)
1986 - Brothers by Choice (TV movie) (composer)
1986 - The Truth About Alex (TV movie) (composer)
1985 - Screwballs II (composer)
1984 - Hockey Night (TV movie) (composer)
1982 - Spring Fever (composer)
1982 - Marva Collins: Excellence in Education (TV short documentary) (composer)
1982 - Heart of Gold (TV movie documentary) (composer: theme music)
1980 - The Dream Never Dies (documentary) (composer)
1979 - Fast Company (songs and music score)
1977-1978 - Homemade Television (TV series) (3 seasons) (actor, composer, musician)
1977 - Valdy Down Home Special'' (TV special) (actor, composer, musician)

References

External links
 
 
 
 
 

Living people
Canadian film score composers
Canadian television composers
Canadian songwriters
Jack Richardson Producer of the Year Award winners
1953 births
Sanford H. Calhoun High School alumni